This list of the Cenozoic life of Arizona contains the various prehistoric life-forms whose fossilized remains have been reported from within the US state of Arizona and are between 66 million and 10,000 years of age.

A

 †Adelphailurus
 †Adelphailurus kansensis
  †Agriotherium
 †Alforjas
 †Alilepus
 †Alilepus browni
 †Alilepus wilsoni
 †Aluralagus
 †Aluralagus bensonensis
 †Aluralagus virginiae – type locality for species
 †Ambystoma
  †Ambystoma tigrinum
  †Amphimachairodus
 †Amphimachairodus coloradensis
 †Amplibuteo
 †Amplibuteo concordatus
 †Antecalomys
 †Antecalomys vasquezi
 Antrozous
 †Antrozous pallidus
 Aquila
 †Aquila bivia
  †Arctodus
 †Aztlanolagus
 †Aztlanolagus agilis

B

 Baiomys
  Bassariscus
 †Bensonomys
 †Bensonomys arizonae
 †Bensonomys elachys – or unidentified comparable form
 †Bensonomys gidleyi
 †Bensonomys yazhi
 Bison
 †Boreohippidion
 †Boreohippidion galushai
  †Borophagus
 †Borophagus diversidens
 †Borophagus parvus – type locality for species
 Brachylagus
 Bufo
 †Bufo pliocompactilis
 †Bufo woodhousei

C

 †Calcibacunculus – type locality for genus
 †Calcibacunculus tenuis – type locality for species
 †Calciphilus – type locality for genus
 †Calciphilus abboti – type locality for species
 †Calcitro – type locality for genus
 †Calcitro fisheri – type locality for species
 †Calcoschizomus – type locality for genus
 †Calcoschizomus latisternum – type locality for species
  †Camelops
 †Camelops hesternus – or unidentified comparable form
 Canis
 †Canis armbrusteri
  †Canis dirus
 †Canis edwardii
 †Canis ferox
 †Canis latrans
 †Canis thooides – type locality for species
  †Capromeryx
 †Capromeryx arizonensis
 †Capromeryx gidleyi
 †Carpocyon
 †Carpocyon robustus
 Castor
 Celtis
 †Celtis reticulata
 †Cernictis
 †Cernictis repenningi – type locality for species
 Cervus
  †Chasmaporthetes
 †Chasmaporthetes ossifragus – type locality for species
 †Chrysocyon
 †Chrysocyon nearcticus – type locality for species
 †Citellus
 †Citellus bensoni
 †Citellus cochisei
 Cnemidophorus
 †Copemys
 Cratogeomys
 †Cratogeomys bensoni
 †Cratogeomys sansimonensis
 Crotaphytus – or unidentified comparable form
 †Cupidinimus
 †Cupidinimus bidahochiensis
  †Cuvieronius

D

  Desmodus
 †Desmodus stocki
  †Diceratherium
 †Dinohippus
 †Dinohippus leidyanus
 Dipodomys
 †Dipodomys gidleyi
 †Dipodomys hibbardi
 †Dipodomys minor
 †Dipoides
 †Dipoides williamsi – type locality for species
 †Domninoides – tentative report

E

  †Epicyon
 †Epicyon haydeni
 Eptesicus – or unidentified comparable form
 Equus
  †Equus scotti – or unidentified comparable form
 †Equus simplicidens
 Erethizon
 †Erethizon bathygnathum
 †Eucyon
 †Eucyon davisi
 Eumeces
 Eumops
 †Eumops perotis – or unidentified comparable form

G

 †Galushamys
 †Galushamys redingtonensis
 †Geococcyx
 †Geococcyx californianus
 Geomys
 †Geomys minor
  †Glossotherium
 †Glossotherium chapadmalense
  †Glyptotherium
 †Glyptotherium arizonae
 †Glyptotherium texanum

H

  †Hemiauchenia
 †Hesperotestudo
 Heterodon
 †Heterodon nasicus – or unidentified comparable form
 †Histiotus
 †Histiotus stocki
  †Homotherium – tentative report
 Hyla
 †Hypolagus
 †Hypolagus arizonensis – type locality for species
 †Hypolagus edensis
 †Hypolagus ringoldensis
 †Hypolagus tedfordi
 †Hypolagus vetus

I

 Ictalurus – tentative report
  †Indarctos – tentative report

J

 †Jacobsomys
 †Jacobsomys verdensis

K

 †Kansasimys
 †Kansasimys wilsoni
  Kinosternon
 †Kinosternon arizonense – type locality for species

L

 Lampropeltis
 †Lampropeltis getulus
 Lasiurus
  †Lasiurus blossevillii – or unidentified comparable form
 Lemmiscus
 †Lemmiscus curtatus
 Lepus
 †Lepus benjamini – type locality for species
 Lynx

M

 †Machairodus
 †Mammut
 †Mammuthus
  †Mammuthus columbi
 Marmota
 †Marmota arizonae – type locality for species
 Martes
 †Megalonyx
 †Megalonyx jeffersonii
  †Megatylopus
 †Megatylopus matthewi
 Meleagris
 †Meleagris crassipes – or unidentified comparable form
 †Meleagris progenes – or unidentified comparable form
 †Merychyus
 †Merychyus calaminthus
 †Metalopex
 †Metalopex macconnelli
 Microtus
 Mictomys
 †Mictomys vetus
 †Morrillia
 †Morrillia barbouri
 Mustela
 †Mustela frenata – or unidentified comparable form
 Myotis
 †Myotis thysanodes
 †Myotis velifer

N

  †Nannippus
 †Nannippus peninsulatus
 †Nekrolagus
 †Nekrolagus progressus
 †Neochoerus
 Neotoma
 †Neotoma albigula – or unidentified comparable form
  †Neotoma cinerea
 †Neotoma fossilis
 †Neotoma mexicana – or unidentified comparable form
 †Neotoma quadriplicata
 †Neotoma taylori
 †Neotoma vaughani – type locality for species
 Nerodia
 †Nerterogeomys
 †Nerterogeomys persimilis
  †Nothrotheriops
 †Nothrotherium
 †Nothrotherium shastense
 Notiosorex
 †Notiosorex crawfordi
 †Notolagus
 †Notolagus lepusculus

O

  Odocoileus
 Ogmodontomys
  Ondatra
 †Ondatra idahoensis
 †Ondatra meadensis
 †Ondatra zibethicus
 †Onychocampodea – type locality for genus
 †Onychocampodea onychis – type locality for species
 †Onychojapyx – type locality for genus
 †Onychojapyx schmidti – type locality for species
 †Onycholepisma – type locality for genus
 †Onycholepisma arizonae – type locality for species
 †Onychomachilis – type locality for genus
 †Onychomachilis fisheri – type locality for species
 Onychomys
 †Onychomys bensoni
 †Onychomys pedroensis
 †Onychothelyphonus – type locality for genus
 †Onychothelyphonus bonneri – type locality for species
 †Ophiomys
 †Ophiomys taylori – or unidentified comparable form
 Ovis
  †Ovis canadensis – type locality for species

P

 †Paenemarmota
 †Paleokoenenia – type locality for genus
 †Paleokoenenia mordax – type locality for species
 Panthera
  †Panthera leo
 †Parajulus
 †Parajulus onychis – type locality for species
 †Paramachaerodus
    †Paramylodon
 †Paramylodon harlani
 †Paronychomys
 †Paronychomys alticuspis – type locality for species
 †Paronychomys lemredfieldi
 †Paronychomys tuttlei
 Perognathus
 †Perognathus gidleyi
 †Perognathus henryredfieldi
 †Perognathus mclaughlini
 †Perognathus pearlettensis
 †Perognathus strigipredus – type locality for species
 Peromyscus
 †Peromyscus brachygnathus
 †Peromyscus hagermanensis
 †Peromyscus minimus
 †Phugatherium
 †Phugatherium dichroplax
 Pituophis
  †Pituophis melanoleucus
  †Platygonus
 †Platygonus compressus
 †Pleiolama
 †Pleiolama vera
 †Plesiogulo
 †Plesiogulo lindsayi
 †Plesiogulo marshalli
 †Pliogale
 †Pliogale furlongi
 †Plionarctos
 †Pliophenacomys
 †Pliophenacomys primaevus
 †Plioprojapyx – type locality for genus
 †Plioprojapyx primitivus – type locality for species
 †Pliotaxidea
 †Pliotaxidea nevadensis – or unidentified comparable form
 †Prodipodomys
 †Prodipodomys idahoensis
 †Prodipodomys kansensis
 †Prosigmodon
 †Prosigmodon holocuspis
 †Protolabis
 †Protolabis coartatus
 †Protolabis yavapaiensis – type locality for species
  †Pseudaelurus – report made of unidentified related form or using admittedly obsolete nomenclature
  Ptinus
 †Ptinus priminidi

R

 †Rana
 Reithrodontomys
 †Reithrodontomys galushai
 †Reithrodontomys rexroadensis
 †Reithrodontomys wetmorei – or unidentified comparable form
 †Repomys
 †Repomys arizonensis
 †Repomys panacaensis – or unidentified comparable form
  †Rhynchotherium
 †Rhynchotherium falconeri – tentative report

S

 Scaphiopus
 Sciurus
  †Sciurus aberti – or unidentified comparable form
 Sigmodon
 †Sigmodon curtisi
 †Sigmodon minor
 Sorex
 †Sorex taylori
 Spermophilus
 †Spermophilus tuitus
 †Spermophilus variegatus
 †Sphenophalos
 †Sphenophalos nevadanus
 Spilogale
 †Spilogale putorius
  †Stegomastodon
 †Stegomastodon mirificus
  †Stenomylus
 †Stockoceros
 †Stockoceros conklingi – or unidentified comparable form
 †Stockoceros onusrosagris
 Sylvilagus
 †Sylvilagus audubonii – or unidentified comparable form
 †Sylvilagus cunicularis – or unidentified comparable form
 †Sylvilagus hibbardi

T

 Tapirus
 †Tapirus merriami – or unidentified comparable form
 Taxidea
 †Taxidea taxus
 Tayassu
 †Tayassu tajacu
  †Teleoceras
 †Teleoceras hicksi
 Terrapene
 †Terrapene ornata – or unidentified comparable form
  †Tetrameryx – or unidentified comparable form
 †Texoceros
 †Texoceros minorei
 Thamnophis
 Thomomys
 †Titanotylopus
 †Titanotylopus nebraskensis
 †Trigonictis
 †Trigonictis macrodon

U

  Urocyon
 †Urocyon galushai – type locality for species

V

 Vulpes
 †Vulpes stenognathus
  †Vulpes velox

References
 

Cenozoic
Arizona
Arizona-related lists